Isaac Mbulelo Sileku is a South African politician who has been a Member of the Western Cape Provincial Parliament since 2022. A member of the Democratic Alliance, he previously served as the Deputy Executive Mayor of the Theewaterskloof Local Municipality from 2016 until 2019 and as a Permanent Delegate to the National Council of Provinces from the Western Cape from 2019 to 2022.

Early life
Sileku grew up in Beaufort West. He was involved in school politics and soon saw himself wanting to become a politician. Sileku later moved to Caledon.

Political career
Sileku joined the Democratic Alliance. In 2011, he was elected  a DA councillor in the Theewaterskloof Local Municipality.

After his re-election in 2016, Sileku was elected deputy executive mayor of the municipality.

Parliament
In 2019 Sileku stood for election to the South African National Assembly as 181st on the DA's national list. He was not elected to the National Assembly. However, the DA selected him to go to the National Council of Provinces, the upper house of parliament. The Western Cape Provincial Parliament elected him as a provincial delegate to the NCOP.

Sileku serves on the Select Committee on Cooperative Governance and Traditional Affairs, Water and Sanitation and Human Settlements, the Select Committee on Petitions and Executive Undertakings, the Select Committee on Security and Justice, the Select Committee on Transport, Public Service and Administration, Public Works and Infrastructure, and the Select Committee on Trade and Industry, Economic Development, Small Business Development, Tourism, Employment and Labour.

In 2019 he had a committee attendance rate of 74% and in 2020 it was 88%. Sileku's DA constituency area is the Cape Agulhas.

Provincial Parliament 
In November 2022, Sileku was sworn in as a member of the Western Cape Provincial Parliament after resigning from the NCOP.

References

External links

Living people
Place of birth missing (living people)
Year of birth missing (living people)
Xhosa people
Members of the National Council of Provinces
Democratic Alliance (South Africa) politicians
Members of the Western Cape Provincial Parliament